Cherene Sherrard Johnson is an American scholar, whose research focuses on the representation of Black women in American literature and visual culture from the mid-19th century to the early 20th century. She is the E. Wilson Lyon Professor of the Humanities at Pomona College in Claremont, California.

Career 
In July 2022, she was appointed the E. Wilson Lyon Professor of the Humanities, an endowed chair at Pomona College.

References

External links
Faculty page at Pomona College

Year of birth missing (living people)
Living people
Pomona College faculty
American literary theorists